Neal Schuerer (born November 16, 1954) is an American politician in the state of Iowa.

Schuerer was born in Amana, Iowa. He attended Central College and is a restaurateur. A Republican, he served in the Iowa State Senate from 1997 to 2005 (30th district from 1997 to 2003 and 38th district from 2003 to 2005).

References

1954 births
Living people
People from Iowa County, Iowa
Central College (Iowa) alumni
Businesspeople from Iowa
Republican Party Iowa state senators